The 1999 African U-17 Championship was a football competition organized by the Confederation of African Football (CAF). The tournament took place in Guinea. The top three teams qualified for the 1999 FIFA U-17 World Championship.

Qualification

Qualified teams

 
 (host nation)

Group stage

Group A

{| cellpadding="0" cellspacing="0" width="100%"
|-
|width="60%"|

Group B

{| cellpadding="0" cellspacing="0" width="100%"
|-
|width="60%"|

Knock-out stage

Semi-finals

Third place match

Final

Winners

Countries to participate in 1999 FIFA U-17 World Championship
The 3 teams which qualified for 1999 FIFA U-17 World Championship.

External links
RSSSF.com
Confederation of African Football

Africa U-17 Cup of Nations
under
1999 in youth association football